Robert George Taylor (7 December 1932—18 June 1981) was a British Conservative politician.

Parliamentary career
Taylor fought Battersea North in 1959 and 1964, but was defeated each time by Labour's Douglas Jay.

He was Member of Parliament for Croydon North West from 1970 until he died in office aged 48 on 18 June 1981 (the 11th anniversary of his election),  triggering the Croydon North West by-election in which the Conservatives lost the seat to Liberal Bill Pitt.

References

External links 
 

1932 births
1981 deaths
Conservative Party (UK) MPs for English constituencies
UK MPs 1970–1974
UK MPs 1974
UK MPs 1974–1979
UK MPs 1979–1983
Politics of the London Borough of Croydon